Ginger Costa-Jackson (born 10 September 1986, and named Ginger Emilia Jackson) is an Italian-American operatic mezzo-soprano who performs often with the Metropolitan Opera since entering its Lindemann Young Artist Development Program in 2007. The Met: Live in HD global broadcasts feature her frequently, as do other major theaters and concert venues worldwide. Costa-Jackson has performed in her native Italian as well as English, French, and Spanish; she speaks these languages fluently, along with limited German. While her signature role is Carmen, Costa-Jackson also performs comic roles, as in her Marchesa di Poggio (Glimmerglass Festival's 2013 adaptation of Verdi's King for a Day /Un giorno di regno), and also her 2009 Celia in Gilbert and Sullivan's Iolanthe with the San Francisco Symphony.

Early life and education 

Ginger Costa-Jackson was born in Palermo, Italy, to an American father, Walt Jackson, and an Italian mother, Emilia Costa. Relocated to Las Vegas, Nevada, the couple had two more daughters (also opera singers): Marina and Miriam. Italian was the children's mother tongue. The family then moved to Salt Lake City, Utah.

Music was a consistent part of Costa-Jackson's early family life. Her maternal grandmother, Lucia Frontini Costa, taught the children Italian lullabies and folk tunes. Emilia, like her mother before her, had a strong singing voice, although neither sang professionally. As a youth, Emilia had piano training at Palermo's , and some private voice lessons. Walt sang in high school and college groups, including Brigham Young University's barbershop quartet. Each of the children took up orchestral instruments as part of their public school education. Costa-Jackson chose the violin, and eventually became first violinist in her school orchestra.

Miriam was the first of the Jackson children to study voice. Her interest sprang from listening to the family's opera CDs, especially The Three Tenors. Costa-Jackson's interests were more academic. She had a perfect record of top grades in school, and thought of becoming a professor of English Literature. When Costa-Jackson heard her sister was singing after beginning lessons, Costa-Jackson determined to study voice as well. However, Costa-Jackson found her voice cracked during lessons. This did not deter her from the decision to study voice.

In 2003, the family took all three daughters to Palermo, where Costa-Jackson and her youngest sister studied privately with Maria Argento Rancatore. The teacher insisted Costa-Jackson see a doctor to ensure her vocal problem was not a medical condition. She received a clear bill of health, and lessons began in earnest. Costa-Jackson then auditioned for a place with the Conservatorio Vincenzo Bellini, and gained entrance there. When the family returned to Utah after five months, Costa-Jackson and Miriam were invited to audition for the Utah Festival Opera. General Director Michael Ballam contracted them to sing for the 2004 season, and they became the youngest opera singers to be hired by the company (ages 17 and 15 respectively).

At 17, Costa-Jackson left public school and went to Italy to live with her aunt and continue private vocal studies. Costa-Jackson completed her high school education via correspondence courses. At 18 she attended one semester at Brigham Young University, but found it suited her better to focus on music, rather than pursue a liberal arts education. Therefore, she returned to Italy. At 19 she began a tour of Italian singing competitions. She won first place in her first competition—the 2006 Leoncavallo Festival International Competition in Montalto Uffugo. Later, as a finalist in the Ottavio Ziino International Lyric Competition, Costa-Jackson met Lenore Rosenberg, who was a judge on that occasion, and the Director of the Lindemann Young Artist Development Program at the Metropolitan Opera. Rosenberg invited Costa-Jackson to audition for James Levine, which resulted in Costa-Jackson's becoming a Met Young Artist in 2007.

Career 

The 2007 jump from private student to the Lindemann Young Artist Development Program was the pivotal point in Costa-Jackson's career. The young singer had no degree, nor had she participated in the Metropolitan Opera National Council Auditions.  Being a young artist gave her access to the Met's considerable resources, world-class teachers and coaches, and on-stage experiences.

Costa-Jackson made her first appearance with the Metropolitan Opera in its 2008 Opening Night Gala as Rosette in Massenet's Manon. Her singing debut came that same year in a new production of Massenet's Thaïs, which starred Renée Fleming and Thomas Hampson. Costa-Jackson was Myrtale. From 2008 to 2013, Costa-Jackson had 15 contracts with the Metropolitan Opera (see Repertory below). General Manager Peter Gelb explained how the Met's young artists are typically assigned small roles with the company. The company develops young artists, often giving them cover assignments before launching them into main roles. This pattern is evident in Costa-Jackson's placement in increasingly demanding cover roles since she graduated from the Lindemann Young Artist Development Program in 2010. Her 2012 and 2013 cover roles included Cherubino (Le nozze di Figaro), Meg Page (Falstaff), and Dorabella (Così fan tutte). Her debut in the title role of Carmen came in 2011 with Glimmerglass Opera, when Francesca Zambello cast Costa-Jackson as the gypsy temptress. Scheduling conflicts required Costa-Jackson to turn down offers to sing Carmen with Opera Hong Kong and Opera Hamilton in Canada. The Met released her from a contract to sing Bersi in Andrea Chénier, so that Costa-Jackson could sing Carmen with Virginia Opera in 2014. Carmen became her signature role and she has performed it all over the world. By March 2019 she had performed it thirteen times, in venues ranging from Seattle and San Diego to Mexico City and Tokyo.

2012 saw Costa-Jackson's debut with San Francisco Opera in the role of Nancy T'ang (Nixon in China), a role she had previously sung under the baton of the composer, John Adams, at the Met. Costa-Jackson's first professional role in Europe was Lola (Mascagni's Cavalleria rusticana) with the Gran Teatre del Liceu in 2011. She was "Puss" in the 2010 U.S. premiere of Montsalvage's El gato con botas produced by the Gotham Chamber Opera.  Costa-Jackson sang Wowkle in the 2010 Metropolitan Opera centennial production of Puccini's La fanciulla del West.

Personal life 

Costa-Jackson married Spencer Burk M.D. on August 31, 2013. The couple live in Sarasota, Florida.

Repertory 

LYADP – Lindeman Young Artist Development Program; 
HD – The Met: Live in HD series

Filmography 

 Massenet: Manon in The Metropolitan Opera's 2008 Opening Night Gala, Decca ... Rosette
 Massenet: Thaïs Decca  ... Myrtale
 Puccini: La fanciulla del West Decca ... Wowkle
 Adams: Nixon in China Nonesuch ... Nancy T'sang

Recognition 

 Lotte Lenya Competition, Kurt Weill Foundation, New York, 2009, 2013
 Loren L. Zachary Society National Vocal Competition for Young Opera Singers, Los Angeles, 2009
 Gerda Lissner International Vocal Competition, New York, 2009
 Opera Index Vocal Competition, New York, 2008
 Licia Albanese-Puccini Foundation International Vocal Competition, New York, 2008
 Verbier Festival Academy Scholarship, Switzerland, 2008
 Italian Cultural Society of Washington, D.C., Ruggiero Morigi Artist Award, 2004, 2005, 2008
 Festival d'Aix-en-Provence Scholarship, France, 2007
 International Competition Voci Nuove della Lirica G. B. Velluti, Mira-Venice, Italy, 2006
 Leoncavallo Festival, Montalto Uffugo, Italy, 2006

References

Sources 

 Nelson, Glen; illustrations by Annie Poon. Mormons at the Met. Paperback ed. Mormon Artists Group, 2012. 
 "Her rise in opera world started with lackluster music lesson" article by Doug Robinson, Deseret News
 "The Exclusive Opera Lively Interview with Ginger Costa-Jackson" article by Luiz Gazzola, Opera Lively

External links 

 
 Official YouTube channel
 Operabase performance schedule
 

American operatic mezzo-sopranos
1986 births
Living people
Italian emigrants to the United States
Brigham Young University alumni
Musicians from Las Vegas
Musicians from Salt Lake City
21st-century American singers
21st-century American women singers
Musicians from Palermo